"Chuck Versus the Seduction Impossible" is the fourteenth episode of the fourth season of Chuck. It originally aired on February 7, 2011.  This episode followed the intended season finale, "Chuck Versus the Push Mix", making it the first of an additional eleven episodes ordered. Chuck Bartowski, Sarah Walker, and John Casey are sent to Morocco to rescue old friend Roan Montgomery (John Larroquette), while Morgan Grimes meets Alex Hugh's (Mekenna Melvin) mother (Clare Carey) and Mary Elizabeth Bartowski (Linda Hamilton) tries to reconnect with her family.

Plot

Main plot
CIA seduction specialist Roan Montgomery (John Larroquette) goes on a rogue mission to Marrakesh, Morocco, to seduce and capture counterfeiter Fatima Tazi (Lesley-Ann Brandt). However, Tazi, known for leading a team of female mercenaries, seduces and captures Roan. John Casey, Chuck Bartowski, and Sarah Walker go to Castle to request a mission. When they call General Beckman, they find her drinking. She reveals that they can rescue Roan from Tazi, although they will be unsupported and in danger. They eagerly accept to escape their overwhelming families.

After Tazi ties Roan up, he offers to be her head of distribution, using his international contacts to protect her flawless counterfeit bills (or "super notes") from the government. Team Bartowski sneaks in using a tracking device in Roan's watch. After tranquilizing Tazi's guards, they proceed to her bedroom, where they find Roan tied up and blindfolded. When they remove his blindfold, Roan reveals that he has seduced Tazi to infiltrate her counterfeiting ring. He orders them to hide so he and Tazi can "seal the deal." When Chuck sneezes, Tazi has him, Sarah, and Roan placed in a dungeon.

Casey crawls out from hiding under the bed and attempts to seduce the guard to the dungeon. He almost succeeds, but a comment about her weight offends her, so Casey tranquilizes her and uses an explosive to destroy the door. As they escape, Casey reveals that he will re-enter the building to continue the mission. Roan refuses to return with Chuck and Sarah, so Casey tranquilizes him before crawling back into the wall. Beckman assigns Roan to the Buy More as punishment for his actions.

Casey watches as Tazi makes a deal with a nefarious Saudi oil tycoon that Chuck earlier flashed on. Tazi offers $1 trillion worth of her "super notes". When the tycoon stresses that his economy depends on a strong dollar, Tazi's women execute the tycoon and his associates without hesitation. Part of the load-bearing wall caves in on Casey, trapping him in the wall. Casey suggests removing his arm to free himself, but General Beckman orders him to wait for further instructions. She then orders Chuck and Sarah to find the location of Tazi's mint so she can destroy it and rescue Casey before he amputates his arm. Beckman permits them to take Roan, supposedly the only man who could seduce Fatima Tazi twice.

Roan climbs up a wall and surrenders to Tazi. He expresses his love for her, and asks her what her motives are for releasing the super notes. She reveals her motives for collapsing the United States economy to avenge the destruction of her village. Beckman listens in and tracks Tazi's mint to her village, ordering an airstrike. Meanwhile, Tazi's guards find Chuck and Sarah trying to sneak Casey out. Tazi angrily orders the guards to execute them. However, Casey manages to shoot them through the wall and Chuck pulls him out. As Tazi holds Roan at gunpoint, Beckman calls his phone. Tazi answers and Beckman expresses her happiness to see him die. Beckman asks to speak with Roan, and she tells him to duck down. It is then revealed that Beckman has personally accompanied the team on their operation, firing a RPG to disable Tazi.

Roan and Beckman
It is revealed that General Beckman and Roan Montgomery have maintained an ongoing romantic relationship for some time. In Berlin, Germany, during the Fall of the Berlin Wall, they engaged in a tryst and promised to retire together if they survived the next twenty years. Beckman was subsequently angered when Montgomery went on a rogue operation rather than meet her as he promised. She personally joins the team in the field during one of their operations. When Beckman and Montgomery meet at the end of the episode, Beckman ironically admits that she also intended to break off plans to retire—both admit they are too involved in their work to be comfortable settling down in a "normal" life. Beckman only had Montgomery tracked down because "you don't run from a general."

Mary and the Woodcombs
Having been freed from Volkoff Industries, Mary Elizabeth Bartowski (Linda Hamilton) joins her daughter and son-in-law Ellie and Devon Woodcomb to help with Clara. One night, Ellie overhears Mary telling Clara a bedtime story about being poisoned and woken by her partner with an antidote on his lips.

Realizing Mary's desire to stay in the CIA, Ellie gives her consent to do so. Mary reveals that she is making up for missing Ellie and Chuck's childhoods, but Ellie insists that she only needs to be a grandmother. She changes the subject and asks about the agent that kissed Mary awake; Mary reveals that it was her husband.

Casey, Morgan, and Alex
Casey, his daughter Alex McHugh (Mekenna Melvin), and her boyfriend Morgan Grimes visit the Woodcombs to see Clara. When Casey talks about the stress of having a baby, Morgan changes the subject to Alex. Casey angrily suspects that Alex is pregnant, but he is relieved when Morgan denies it. However, Morgan reveals that Alex wants him to meet her mother Kathleen (who believes Casey [as Alexander Coburn] died prior to Alex's birth). Casey agrees to consider talking to Kathleen so Morgan will not have to lie.

After Alex arranges for Morgan to meet Kathleen, Morgan reveals that Casey is going to contact Kathleen. This angers Alex, who only wants to see her mother happy. Morgan contacts Casey, telling him not to see Kathleen. Casey is confused; he asks if Alex will ever let him see Kathleen again.

Casey drives to Kathleen's house to meet with her. As he walks to the door, Kathleen (Clare Carey), Morgan, and Alex come out with an older man. Casey realizes that Kathleen has moved on and, happy for her, decides to leave her alone.

Chuck and Sarah
Chuck and Sarah visit Ellie and Devon to see Clara, but they are overwhelmed with all their questions about their wedding. Chuck, who has finally gotten his family back together, would like to have a big wedding, but Sarah, who has no family to invite, asks to elope. Chuck asks Morgan for advice about saying, "No", and Morgan suggests saying it about several smaller issues first. During their mission, Chuck declines several items from Sarah, but he reluctantly accepts each time.

Chuck and Sarah continue arguing about the wedding plans in the dungeon, with Chuck attached to a literal ball and chain. After they escape, Chuck asks for Roan's advice to seduce Sarah and convince her to have a big wedding. Chuck makes a dinner reservation and puts on a suit, only to find Sarah attempting to seduce him with a belly dance. They are each angered by the other's intentions.

Later, Roan advises them to listen to each other and never go on a mission angry. As they search for Casey, Sarah reveals her real reasons for wanting to elope and they resolve their fight. Later, Chuck expresses a desire to meet Sarah's family.

Production
It was announced in January 2011 that John Larroquette would reprise his highly praised role of Roan Montgomery. Clare Carey also returned briefly as Alex's mother Kathleen McHugh. The episode was written by series co-creator Chris Fedak along with Kristin Newman. Though the episode takes place in Marrakesh, Morocco, the opening shots are actually of the Luxor Temple in Egypt.

Continuity
This episode's title references "Chuck Versus the Seduction", where Roan Montgomery originally appeared. Further, Casey's inability to seduce the dungeon guard is directly attributed to his failure of Roan's "seduction school".

Flashes
 Chuck flashes on a Saudi oil tycoon.

Cultural references
 This episode's title references Mission: Impossible.
 Fatima is believed to be named after the Barbara Carrera villainess Fatima Blush from Never Say Never Again.
 Before sneezing, Chuck compares his situation to The Three Stooges.
 Mary tells Clara a version of the fairy tale Sleeping Beauty.

Music
Songs listed by Alan Sepinwall.
 "Black Red" by Dr. Dog
 "65 Bars & A Taste of Soul" by Charles Wright & the Watts 103rd Street Rhythm Band
 "Breeze" by Alex Silverman
 "Sixteen Tons" by Tennessee Ernie Ford
 "Wind of Change" by Scorpions

Reception
"Chuck Versus the Seduction Impossible" drew 5.41 million viewers.

The episode received positive reviews from critics. Eric Goldman of IGN gave this episode a score of 9 out of 10, praising Larroquette's performance and calling his flashback scene with Friedricy "hysterical". Goldman enjoyed Casey's scenes and found Chuck and Sarah's argument believable, although "the scenes with Mary and Ellie felt like a bit of an afterthought". Goldman concluded, "All in all, 'Chuck Versus The Seduction Impossible' was one of the most purely enjoyable episodes of the season."

HitFix writer Alan Sepinwall wrote, "Larroquette was Larroquette, and Bonita Friedericy made a meal out of the first real General Beckman episode to date, from the dirty blonde '80s flashback to Beckman whipping out a rocket launcher to save her man and take down the evil Fatima. Beckman is usually there to represent the way things are supposed to get done in spy world, as opposed to the ridiculous way Team Bartowski usually conducts itself, so it was amusing to see that Beckman has her own weak spots, and can get just as emotionally over-invested in a mission as Chuck or Sarah, who for once were the ones complaining about all the interpersonal issues interfering with a mission." Alan Sepinwall concluded, "All in all, a very strong start to season 4.1, or whatever we want to call it."

Steve Heisler of The A.V. Club, however, gave the episode a C−, writing "Chuck doesn't do baby steps well, and because last week's episode was so epic, 'Seduction Impossible' was a lot of tiny strides and fabricated drama, saved by a couple of vintage Roan Montgomery/General Beckman shots and Sarah belly dancing."

References

External links
 

Seduction Impossible
2011 American television episodes